Maria Jastrzębska (born 28 March 1953) is a Polish-British poet, feminist, editor, translator and playwright. She has published five full-length volumes of poetry, two pamphlets and a play. She regularly contributes to a wide range of national and international journals and anthologies.

Early life and education
Maria Jastrzębska was born in Warsaw and moved to the United Kingdom as a young child. She went to Ealing Grammar School for Girls, and the Lycée Français Charles de Gaulle, both in London. She later studied Developmental Psychology at the University of Sussex.

She has taught communication in further education and also creative writing in adult education.

Literary career
Jastrzębska has been writing since she was very young; her first book, created before she could write, was entitled My Book and was filled with squiggles. As a young adult, she began contributing to a range of feminist journals, including Spare Rib, Writing Women and Spinster.

She continues to engage in community projects, literary festivals and residencies.

Personal life
She lives with her partner in Brighton.

Works and themes
Jastrzębska's fourth full-length collection The True Story of Cowboy Hat and Ingénue was published by Cinnamon Press  A review by David Caddy in Tears in the Fence said of this collection "The range of voices and languages, the various narratives all succinctly described, are all impressive and produce an exhilarating read". Of Cedry z Walpole Park, Eliza Szybowicz writes "This poet’s coat of arms has a wolf on it. Her language sniffs out, tracks, rips flesh, fights, sometimes chooses escape, parties madly, desires. Don’t you wish you were in her pack!". Her fifth full-length collection Small Odysseys was published by Waterloo Press in October 2022.

She is the co-founder of Queer Writing South and South Pole and co-edited Queer in Brighton (New Writing South 2014) with Anthony Luvera. Her poetry features in the British Library project Poetry Between Two Worlds and her drama Dementia Diaries which toured nationally to sell-out audiences was described as "like a piece of chamber music, and transcends ... the literalness of language".

She has also worked with two other Polish-connected artists, fine artist Dagmara Rudkin and composer Peter Copley along with director Mark H Hewitt and artist Wendy Pye to collaborate on a project inspired by The Snow Queen story by Hans Christian Andersen. Following research and development grants from the Arts Council England they worked together to produce a multi-media installation in the Regency Town House, Brighton, the production then toured with five performances in Portsmouth, Lewes, Birmingham and Lambeth, London. Jastrzębska’s poems were written in the voices of Crow, a multilingual, timeless trickster, migrant and crone, and Gerda and Kai two young, non-binary identifying young people. The poems include ‘Ponglish’  – a hybrid language of Polish and English. A triptych of filmpoems of Maria Jastrzębska’s work was made by Wendy Pye and screened internationally. 

Jastrzębska's work focuses on borders and boundaries: between countries, cultures and languages, between social and sexual identities, health and illness. Her experience of arriving in the UK from Poland as a child, with having to adapt to a different language, culture and society, has informed all her written work.  Poet and fellow ‘exile’ George Szirtes says her "poems open out like adventures in a dual land that is both here and elsewhere".

Publications

Full-length collections
 Syrena (2004), Redbeck Press, 
 Everyday Angels, Waterloo Press,  (2009) 
 At the Library of Memories, Waterloo Press, (2014)   
 The True Story of Cowboy Hat and Ingénue, Cinnamon Press, (2018) 
 Small Odysseys, Waterloo Press, (October 2022)

Pamphlets 

 Home from Home (2002) 
 I'll be Back Before You Know it (2008)

Plays 
 Dementia Diaries (2011)

Anthologies
 The New British Poetry, Paladin, (1988) 
 Naming the Waves, Contemporary Lesbian Poetry, Virago Press, (1988) 
 The Virago Book of Wicked Verse, Virago (1992)  
 Parents, Enitharmon  (2000) 
 See How I Land – Oxford Poets & Refugees, Heaven Tree Press (2009) 
 This Line Is Not For Turning, Cinnamon Press (2011) 
 This Assignment Is So Gay, Sibling Rivalry Press, USA, (2013)  
 Images of Women: An Anthology of Contemporary Women's Poetry, Arrowhead Press (2013) 
 Hallelujah for 50ft Women, Bloodaxe (2015)  
 Songs for the Unsung, Grey Hen Press (2017) 
 Wretched Strangers, Boiler House Press (2018)  
 Resistance: Voices of Exiled Writers, Palewell Press (2020)  
 Poetki na czasy zarazy, WBPiCAK (2021) 
 Ukraine in the Work of International Poets, Literary Waves Publishing (2022)

Collaborations 

 Postcards from Poland and Other Correspondences (1990) with artist Jola Scicińska 

 Snow Q cross-arts project and installation at Regency Town House (2018)
 Snow Q live literature performances (2020) 
 Snow Q filmpoems with Wendy Pye: Crow, Have You Seen Kai, Lullaby (2020)

Translated works
 Cedry z Walpole Park (2015) with Anna Blasiak, Pawel Gawroński and Wioletta Grzegorzewska 
 Cutite vechi (2017) trans. Lidia Vianu

Translations
 Elsewhere, Iztok Osojnik, (with Ana Jeinikar) 2011 
 The Great Plan B, Justyna Bargielska 2017, Smokestack Press

Edited works
 Whoosh! A Queer Writing South Anthology (with John McCullough) 
 Different and Beautiful. An Anthology of Writing by LGBT young people from Allsorts Youth Project 
 Queer in Brighton (2014, with Anthony Luvera)

References

External Links 

 Between Two Worlds: Poetry & Translation: Maria Jastrzębska reading. https://sounds.bl.uk/Arts-literature-and-performance/Between-two-worlds-poetry-and-translation/024M-C1340X0073XX-0000V0
London Book Fair 2017 Poland Market Focus: Day 2 https://literature.britishcouncil.org/blog/2017/live-blogging-from-london-book-fair-day2/

1953 births
Living people
Polish women poets
Polish women dramatists and playwrights
People from Brighton
Polish emigrants to the United Kingdom